Sweet and Low is a short musical film from 1947 featuring Richard Webb, Catherine Craig, and Karolyn Grimes and with the Will Maston Trio (Will Mastin [billed as "Will Maston"], Sammy Davis Sr. and Sammy Davis Jr.).

Synopsis 
Richard Webb and Catherine Craig are a married couple who throw a masquerade party with live entertainment in their home. The film is about the various individuals and groups who appear there.

External links
Sweet and Low (1947) at the IMDb
Sweet and Low (1947) data at the Library of Congress Jazz on the Screen Filmography
About the 1947 Film "Sweet and Low" at the Tap Dancing Resources

1947 films
American musical films
1947 musical films
1940s American films